Grant Anderson (born 20 August 1986) is a Scottish professional footballer who plays as a winger for Forfar Athletic.

Career
After spending time with Kirkintilloch Rob Roy and Stenhousemuir, Anderson moved to Hamilton Academical in June 2011. Anderson debuted for the Accies on 23 July 2011 in the Scottish Challenge Cup, before making his SFL debut for the club a fortnight later. In March 2012, Anderson was sent out on loan to Stenhousemuir, alongside Kieran Millar. In May 2012, Anderson was released by the Lanarkshire club, after his return from a loan spell in Larbert.

In June 2012, Anderson joined Raith Rovers. After four seasons at Stark's Park, which included the winning goal in the Scottish Cup, Anderson signed for fellow Scottish Championship club Queen of the South on a one-year contract on 14 June 2016. On 20 January 2017 and after only half a season, Anderson departed Queens by mutual consent, subsequently signing for Scottish League One club Peterhead until the end of the 2016–17 season. In March 2017 he became a qualified referee. He was released at the end of the season following the club's relegation to Scottish League Two. After leaving Peterhead, Anderson moved to the opposite side of the country, signing for Scottish League One club Stranraer on 15 June 2017.

He returned to Raith Rovers in June 2019.

Kelty Hearts announced the signing of Anderson on 20 October 2020. He moved to Forfar Athletic on 1 February 2021.

Career statistics

Honours
Raith Rovers
Scottish Challenge Cup: 2013–14

References

External links

1986 births
Living people
Scottish footballers
Kirkintilloch Rob Roy F.C. players
Stenhousemuir F.C. players
Hamilton Academical F.C. players
Raith Rovers F.C. players
Queen of the South F.C. players
Peterhead F.C. players
Stranraer F.C. players
Scottish Football League players
Association football wingers
Scottish Junior Football Association players
Scottish Professional Football League players
Kelty Hearts F.C. players
Lowland Football League players